Eilean nan Deargannan (sometimes written as Eilean Deargannan) is a small island in Loch Lomond, in west central Scotland. It lies between Rowardennan (to the east) and Inverbeg.

Etymology
The name is thought to mean "Island of fleas or sandhoppers" in Scottish Gaelic. It has euphemistically been suggested to come from "purple island" as well.

Footnotes

Islands of Loch Lomond
Uninhabited islands of Stirling (council area)